Road Noise / The Official Bootleg is the title of the first live album by singer-songwriter Judie Tzuke, released in 1982. It was recorded at the Hammersmith Odeon in London on the 24 and 25 May 1982 and at Glastonbury Festival on 20 June 1982.

The album peaked at no.39 on the UK Album Chart.

Track listing
All tracks composed by Judie Tzuke and Mike Paxman; except where indicated
Side one
 "Heaven Can Wait" / "Chinatown" – 8:55
 "I'm Not a Loser" (Bob Noble, Paul Muggleton) – 3:58
 "Information" – 3:20

Side two
"You Are the Phoenix" (Noble, Muggleton) – 4:08
 "The Flesh Is Weak" (Tzuke, Noble, Jeff Rich, John Edwards, Paxman, Muggleton) – 4:12
 "Sportscar" – 6:05
 "For You" – 4:25
 "Come Hell or Waters High" (Muggleton) – 3:53

Side three
"Southern Smiles" / "Katiera Island" – 12:50
 "Love on the Border" (Paxman, Muggleton) – 3:57
 "Black Furs" – 4:33

Side four
"City of Swimming Pools" – 5:10
 "Bring the Rain" – 3:42
 "Sukarita" – 3:28
 "Stay with Me till Dawn" – 4:10
 "The Hunter" (Al Jackson Jr., Booker T. Jones, Carl Wells) - 4:25

Personnel
Band members
Judie Tzuke – vocals
Mike Paxman – guitars, backing vocals
Paul Muggleton – guitar, percussion, backing vocals, producer
Bob Noble – keyboards, backing vocals
John "Rhino" Edwards – bass, backing vocals
Jeff Rich – drums

Production
John Hudson – engineer
Andy Canelle – assistant engineer
Jeff Titmus – sound and recording supervisor
Additional material recorded live at "The Regal", Hitchin, Hertfordshire
Re-mixed at Mayfair Studios, London

References

External links
Official website

Judie Tzuke albums
1982 live albums
Chrysalis Records live albums